AEK/Achilleas Ayiou Theraponta was a Cypriot football club based in Limassol. The club was formed in 1997 after the merger of the clubs, AEK Katholiki and Achilleas Ayiou Theraponta. The teams was playing sometimes in Second and in Third Division. It dissolved at 2005.

References

Association football clubs disestablished in 2005
Defunct football clubs in Cyprus
Association football clubs established in 1997
1997 establishments in Cyprus
2005 disestablishments in Cyprus